Igor Borisovich Fedorov is a Russian amateur boxer who won gold medals at the 2018 Youth World Championships, and European Youth Championships, both in the heavyweight division.

References

External links

Living people
Year of birth missing (living people)
Date of birth missing (living people)
Russian male boxers
Heavyweight boxers
People from Azov
Sportspeople from Rostov Oblast